This is an article about qualification for the 2017 Girls' Youth European Volleyball Championship.

Qualification summary

Participating teams
The following 35 teams took part at the qualification tournament.

Qualified teams

At the end of qualification, the following 12 teams progressed to the tournament final round.

Pool standing procedure
 Number of matches won
 Match points
 Sets ratio
 Points ratio
 Result of the last match between the tied teams

Match won 3–0 or 3–1: 3 match points for the winner, 0 match points for the loser
Match won 3–2: 2 match points for the winner, 1 match point for the loser

First round
Four teams competed in round-robin with the winner advancing to the second round.
venue:  Frejahallen, Falköping, Sweden
28–29 October times are Central European Summer Time (UTC+02:00) and 30 October times are Central European Time (UTC+01:00)

Pool 1

|}

|}

Second round
Teams are divided into eight pools of four teams each. A round-robin takes place within each pool with the pool winners and the three best second place teams qualifying to the final round.
Pools composition

Pool A
venue:  Sports Hall Daugava, Riga, Latvia
All times are Eastern European Time (UTC+02:00)

|}

|}

Pool B
venue:  Centro Pavesi, Milan, Italy
All times are Central European Time (UTC+01:00)

|}

|}

Pool C
venue:  Sportna Dvorana, Nova Gorica, Slovenia
All times are Central European Time (UTC+01:00)

|}

|}

Pool D
venue:  S.Dariaus and S.Gireno Sport Center, Kaunas, Lithuania
All times are Eastern European Time (UTC+02:00)

|}

|}

Pool E
venue:  Olimpia Sports Hall, Ploiești, Romania
All times are Eastern European Time (UTC+02:00)

|}

|}

Pool F
venue:  Downtown Elementary School Sports Hall, Jászberény, Hungary
All times are Central European Time (UTC+01:00)

|}

|}

Pool G
venue:  Dvorana Gimnasium, Rovinj, Croatia
All times are Central European Time (UTC+01:00)

|}

|}

Pool H
venue:  Hristo Botev Sport Hall, Sofia, Bulgaria
All times are Eastern European Time (UTC+02:00)

|}

|}

References

External links
Official website

Girls' Youth European Volleyball Championship
European Championship U19
Volleyball